Kuarrhaphis is a genus of calcareous sponges in the family Trichogypsiidae. It consists of one species, Kuarrhaphis cretacea.

References

Calcaronea
Monotypic sponge genera
Taxa named by Arthur Dendy
Taxa named by Ernst Haeckel